The Sora (alternative names and spellings include Saora, Saura, Savara and Sabara) are a Munda ethnic group from eastern India. They live in southern Odisha and north coastal Andhra Pradesh.

The Soras mainly live in Gajapati, Rayagada and Bargarh districts of Odisha. They are also present in Srikakulam, Vizianagaram and Visakhapatnam districts. In the census, however, some Soras are classified under Shabar or Lodha, the name for another very different Munda tribe. They inhabit blocks of Gunupur, Padmapur and Gudari. Their highest concentration is found in the Puttasingi area, approximately 25 km away from Gunupur NAC. Although, they are close to the assimilation process, yet some interior GPs like Rejingtal, Sagada and Puttasingi have Soras who still retain their traditional tribal customs and traditions.

They are known by various names such as Savara, Sabara, Sora, and Soura. They are concentrated in parts of Gunupur adjoining to the blocks of Gumma, Serango of Gajapati district. The Soras speak Sora, a Munda language. However, written language in Sora is not followed by all. They practice shifting cultivation, with a few gradually taking up settled agriculture.

They are of medium or short stature.  The Savara villages consist of houses with mud walls and sedge grass roofs, usually situated in foothills.  The adult males dress with a gavancha and the women with saris.  They are also sometimes called Lanjia Souras due to their dress pattern of wearing a loin cloth hanging from behind and which could be mistakenly identified as a tail by a stranger.

They are endogamous and the clan, although absent, is related to Birinda, which is exogamous. Families are nuclear although joint or extended families are also found. Marriages are made by bride capture, elopement, and by negotiations.

The Sora people are a dwindling jungle tribe with a distinctive shamanic culture. According to an article in Natural History, "a shaman, usually a woman, serves as an intermediary between the two worlds [of the living and the dead]. During a trance, her soul is said to climb down terrifying precipices to the underworld, leaving her body for the dead to use as their vehicle for communication. One by one the spirits speak through her mouth. Mourners crowd around the shaman, arguing vehemently with the dead, laughing at their jokes, or weeping at their accusations."

History
The Soras were already mentioned under the name of s in  s, who associate them with the Indo-Aryan Vaidarbhas and non-Indo-Aryan Pulindas.

Graeco-Roman authors later mentioned the Soras, with Pliny calling them the "Suari" and Ptolemy calling them the "Sabarae."

Culture

Instead of clan organization they have their extended families called Birinda, which consists of descendants from a common ancestors of four to five generations. The Soras' religion is very elaborate and deep rooted. They are animist and believe in large number of deities and ancestral spirits. Dance and music constitute part and parcel of their rich aesthetic life.

The Sora family is polygamous. The total household economy revolves around the woman member who is hardworking and who helps her husband in ploughing and harvesting crops in addition to attending household chores exclusively.

The Sora people are the most prevalent practitioners of the podu cultivation system in Srikakulam district. Living high in the hills, they have little level land available and so cannot usually plough. They slash-and-burn forested land, planting millet and pulses between the tree stumps that are left and which limit the effects of erosion. After a couple of years of use, they allow the land to recover by cultivating a different area; in due course, they return to the original plot. In addition to podu, the Sora also construct irrigated terraces where it is feasible and upon those, they grow rice.

Oral Tradition:

The Sora community has a rich depository of oral tradition. Their singers are known as  Kin Kin mar, and storytellers are known as  Katabirmar. They play  Ranai- a  local fiddle to sing the song. Their priest  Buyang spell the myths of Origin and narratives. Their folklore is enriched with local knowledge. Sahitya Akademi, New Delhi has published a  book on Saora  Folk literature written by  Dr. Mahendra Kumar Mishra, a noted folklorist of India. Cornelia Mallebrein, A German ethnographer has conducted research and study on  Id- Tal, the traditional Sora ritual painting.  Nowadays, Id-Tal Painting has highly popular in the market across the world.

Education in Saora Language; Government of  Odisha has introduced the Saora language in primary schools under Multilingual Education Programme from class I to class V. The eminent teachers from the Sora community have written  Sora primers. Enam Gomanga, Philip Sabara, Ghasi Sabara, Injuram Sabara are the eminent writers of Sora Primer guided by Dr. MAhendra Kumar Mishra, Former  State Coordinator,  MLE program, Odisha  Mangei Gomanga, the inventor of  Sora script Sora - Sompen in Marichaguda has been used by the Sora people for their ethnic solidarity. Prof Khageswara Mahapatra, an eminent linguist of Odisha had promoted Sora script through his patronization.

Religion
The Soras are highly religious with each and every natural phenomenon attributed to the works of some Gods, deities or spirits of traditional belief.  Therefore, the customary law, values, norms are highly respected by all members of the society for the fear of inviting personal or communal harms.

They believe that spirits guide their destiny, worshiping mainly the deities Sandhidemudu and Jakaradevatha. According to the legend, Lord Nrusimha was being worshipped at Neelagiri (Puri) along with Neelamadhaba. As mentioned earlier, Lord Nrushimha is being worshiped in a separate temple adjacent to Muktimandapa/ Muktamandapa. According to the legend, the image of Neelamadhaba was made of Neelakanta mani (emerald). However, the present image of the deity is made of neem wood. Legend further says that Lord Jagannath was originally worshiped by a Savara raja (an aboriginal tribal chieftain) named Viswabasu. Having heard about the glory of the deity, Raja Indradyumna sent a Brahmin priest called Vidyapati to discover the exact location of the deity who was then secretly worshipped by Viswabasu inside the cave of a dense forest. Vidyapati tried his best, but could not locate the place of worship. Finally, he could manage to marry Lalita, the daughter of Viswabasu. At repeated request of Lalita, Viswabasu took his son-in-law blind-folded to a cave wherein Lord Neelamadhaba was being worshipped. Vidyapati was a very intelligent man. He dropped mustard seeds on the ground on his way. After a few days, the seeds germinated which helped Vidyapati to locate the cave wherein the deity was being worshiped in secret. On hearing from Vidyapati subsequently, Raja Indradyumna immediately rushed to Odra desa (Odisha) to have a darshan of the deity. The king was disappointed at the sudden disappearance of the deity. The deity was hidden in sand. Raja Indradyumna was determined not to return without having a darshan of the deity and observed fast onto death at Neelagiri. The deity was pleased with the king. Thereafter, the king performed a horse sacrifice and built a magnificent temple for the deity.

However, in the last many decades many of the traditional Sora beliefs have been superseded by Christianity that was introduced by missionaries. In many areas the shamanic and animist beliefs are distant memories, and in some areas, particularly around Puttasingh the graveyards of the ancestors have been destroyed. There is nowadays a move by nationalist Hindu groups to convert the Sora to Hinduism. This conflict has given rise to great tension in the area.

Social life

The Sora have a traditional political organization at each village and region, having hereditary post of Gomango (or Gamong; secular head), Buyya (or Buya; religious head), Mondal, Raito, and Barik (messenger). The Soras have made history in pre-British and British period and post independence as a community known for their economic and political integrity.

They practice shifting cultivation and the men hunt. A weekly market, called shandies, is an important role in the society, in the economy and in culture exchanges with other tribes and Western culture.

Notable people

Padala Bhudevi, Nari Shakti Puraskar recipient

See also
Pal Lahara State
Ranpur State

References 

Saora  Tales and Songs, Edited by Dr Mahendra Kumar Mishra,  Published by Sahitya Akademi,  New Delhi. 2005, 2018

♙      2. Dr. Chitrasen Pasayat, http://orissa.gov.in/e-magazine/Orissareview/may2006/engpdf/33-36.pdf Lord Jagannath : Symbol of Unity and Integration,

External links

PBS documentary with info on sora language

Scheduled Tribes of Odisha
Scheduled Tribes of Andhra Pradesh